The Bandini 750 sport siluro (torpedo) is a racing car, produced from 1950 to 1956 by the Italian company Bandini Cars.

Born in 1950, this new type marked the consecration of Bandini as an international challenger in the smaller classes. The 750 sports torpedo brought to Forlì the SCCA H Modified Championship in 1955 and 1957 and the SCCA South-West division championship from 1961 until 1963.  They also had many victories in different categories on both sides of the Atlantic Ocean.

The first Siluros had cycle fenders. Later rules stipulated that cars must have attached fenders so owners simply added aluminum to the fenders and connected them to the body. The Bandini factory then produced them with fully attaching fenders. These fenders could be removed and a tonneau cover placed over the passenger seat which made the cars eligible for the Formula Three open wheeled class.

History

Tony Pompeo, an American car dealer of Italian origin, was pleased with the previous Bandini 1100 and 1100 sport he had purchased, so he explicitly asked Ilario Bandini for cars to run in the 750 cc engine capacity category.

Pompeo sent a Crosley engine to Bandini for him to study and use. Lightweight and compact, this American engine was very versatile, having been used with boats, aircraft, and even in fire pumps. It had aluminium block with five main bearings, monoblock with to two valves per cylinder, gear driven single overhead cam, and more.  Bandini immediately began making modifications for racing, including longer Stroke steel crankshaft (raising the displacement to 747 cc), new pistons, camshafts, and oil pump.

With the modified Crosley engine, the 750 sports torpedo was launched, contesting scores of races: hill climbs, road courses, and airbase circuits, as well as challenging six- and twelve-hour endurance events, such as the 12 Hours of Sebring or Mille Miglia, both of which were World Sports Car Championship rounds.

The 750 sports torpedo was competitive, versatile, and suited to competing in higher categories.

A front precise and stable, with good traction and drive, low center of mass, and  aerodynamic efficiency were the key words of the successes but especially the high power-to-weight ratio that put out the qualities of the pilot. It is no coincidence Jim Pauley (who also ran at Le Mans), Dave Michaels, and Tom O'Brien collected the best results in years when Bandinis (powered by Siata, Offenhauser, and Alfa Romeo) run in SCCA's FM (F Modified) category alongside Ferraris, Maseratis, and Porsches. Michaels in a 1625cc (99 ci) Bandini-Offy for a year and half held the Thompson track record in the under-two liter class.

Speed and quality showed the under-750 category, in the hands of Dolph Vilardi (U.S. Champion 1955), Melvin Sachs (U.S. Champion 1957), Henry Rudkin (second place in U.S. standings 1956), and George Tipsword, to mention only a few; in addition were Massimo Bondi (ninth in the 1953 Mille Miglia), and Ilario Bandini himself (then age 44) won the 1955 and 1956) Predappio 'climbs outright, earned class wins at Raticosa, Consuma, and Reggio Emilia, and fourth in the Italian league standings.

With success came newspaper coverage and showings at exhibitions in Chicago and Madison Square Garden in New York. In 1957 the award-winning author and screenwriter William F. Nolan used a 750 torpedo in a story.

From 1953, the 750 torpedo featured a radically revised and improved engine. It was fitted with a new aluminium cylinder head gear-driven dual overhead camshafts. Also changed was the position of the distributor, which was placed on the head. The block was fitted with cast iron sleeves in the cylinders. Also added were new connecting rods, increased capacity oil pump, a radiator of barrel-shaped calettata and a cup of increased capacity and different shapes to allow a further lowering the centre of gravity of the car.

The chassis

The chassis construction Bandini, was an adaptation to the new size category in addition to new technical suggested the experience with the 1100 torpedo.

 Structure and material: a frame of elliptical section tubes, special steel aeronautics derivation; patent No. 499843
 Suspension:
 Front: Independent, triangles overlapping with shock hydraulic telescopic tilted and springs cylindrical helical coaxial; bar Account
 Rear: a bridge with two rigid leaf spring semiellittiche longitudinal and shock hydraulic vertical telescopic
 Braking system:
 Service: hydraulics, drum autoventilant front and rear lighted
 Parking Mechanical tape, on  transmission shaft
 Steering: a worm wheel and twisted with vibration damper on shaft
 Drive: on the left (right upon request)
 Wheels: Borrani Ray
 Fuel tank: 
 Transmission: rear halfshaft with central differential
 Weight: bare chassis 
 Weight total as 750:

The body

From 1950 to 1953 Cycle Fenders

The first two-seater aluminium  bodies were made by the Rocco Motto's company.
The "functional simplicity" that characterizes many Bandini automobiles was inspired by race boats whose lines were drawn for minimal drag. The front is almost entirely made up of an egg crate grille for increased engine cooling. Near the front of the car, fenders in which the headlights are concealed guide air around the front suspension.  They taper to form a "Coke bottle" shape aimed at improving stability. The vehicle width does not increase much while still providing a small space for the occasional passenger. The tail tapers to an end with two small fenders and a central light. Gills at the front end of the car vent air from the engine compartment..
Later, to meet the requests coming from the United States, bespoke body types were made for Bandini. The lights were positioned behind the front grille, avoiding the complex hideaway headlights characterising the Motto cars.

From 1953 to 1956

The technical regulation imposed a restyling to 750 sports torpedo. It was not carried out a body including wheels but were created wheel that could be attached to the body while maintaining the standard of performance and lightness that were requested.
It was amended to make uniform the line; whole body became more smooth and round and away considerably from the model of departure but adding aesthetic pleasantness aerodynamic performance. 
This type is characterized also for the curious position of the headlights, mounted between the wheels and the car body, resting position not oppose any resistance but aerodynamic meet with the mere presence requirements of the regulation. Flourish on 750 sports torpedo
in 1953 also new elements for Bandini: rollbar-headrest-tailed long, perfectly organic line overall, a rigid element that covers the appropriate seat passenger, and new openings on the bonnet and on the side of the carburetors to increase the air mass necessary to engines increased.

Engines

Crosley modified

 Positioning: forward longitudinal, 4-cylinder in-line
 Materials and particularity: base and oil sump alloy, Head single camshaft in a single merger with ironcast block
 Bore: 
 Stroke: 
 Displacement: 747 cc
 Power: 45 hp 7200 rpm
 Power: two carburettors Dell'Orto
 Lubricate: Carter with wet gear pump and filter external wire mesh
 Cooling: forced liquid with centrifugal pump controlled by pulley and belt, cooler on the front
 Gearbox and clutch: 4 speed + RG, clutch single dry disc
 Ignition and electrical equipment: coil and distributor on base, battery 12 V and generator

Bandini-Crosley

 Positioning: forward longitudinal, 4-cylinder in-line
 Materials and particularity: base Crosley 5 media bench and alloy cup of 5 litres capacity, Head in aluminium DOHC Gear with 8 valves inclined,  cylinders dismantled in ironcasted block.
 Bore: 
 Stroke: 
 Displacement: 747 cc
 Compression ratio: 9,4:1
 Power: 65 to 71 hp 8500 rpm
 Power: 2 Weber carburetors double body 35DCO3
 Lubricate: Carter with wet gear pump and filter external wire mesh, aluminum radiator
 Cooling: forced liquid with centrifugal pump controlled by pulley and belt, cooler on the front
 Gearbox and clutch: 4 speed+ RG, clutch single dry disc
 Ignition and electrical equipment: coil and distributor heading, battery 12 V and generator

Siata 1500

 Positioning: forward longitudinal, 4-cylinder in-line
 Displacement: 1496 cc
 Compression ratio: 9,3:1
 Power maximum: 97 hp 6000 rpm
 Power: 4 carburettors
 Lubricate: Carter wet with pump gear and cooler on the front
 Cooling: forced liquid with centrifugal pump and cooler on the front
 Gearbox and clutch: 5 speed + RG clutch single dry disc
 Ignition and electrical equipment: coil and distributor, battery 12 V and generator

Other

The 750 sports  torpedo was used often with different engines: Offenhauser (1625 cc), Saab 750 cc Mercury, MG 1250 cc Alfa Romeo 2000 cc. The most striking was the Bandini Dragster, equipped with a Cadillac  V8 engine.

Trivia
The Bandini 750 sports participated in all editions from 1953 1957 of "Mille Miglia" (as Sebring, valid for the world championship sports) with different crews.
In 1953, taken off the same manufacturer Ilario Bandini in pairs with Sintoni, withdrew its around Forlì.

In 2006, 53 years later, the same car, will lead the crew on arrival Bears Bandini: Ilario grandchildren of Bandini.

See also
 Ilario Bandini
 Bandini Cars

References

External links

 Video departure of MilleMiglia 2006
 Video of the Millemiglia 2006
 Short on board camera MilleMiglia 2008
 Unique Cars International Register

Bandini vehicles
Open wheel racing cars
1950s cars
Sports cars
Cars introduced in 1950